The Alfa Romeo 166 (Type 936) is an executive car produced by the Italian automaker Alfa Romeo, between 1996 and June 2007. The car was designed by Centro Stile Alfa Romeo, under the control of Walter de Silva, and was facelifted in September 2003.

History

In order to keep the design fresh, Alfa Romeo made a series of modifications to the Lancia Kappa based underpinnings, radically changing the suspension set up, and also taking a clean paper approach to the interior. The 166 served as the replacement for the 164.

The car was initially available with a 2.0-litre Twin Spark (155 PS), a 2.5-litre V6 (190 PS), a 3.0 V6 (226 PS) or a V6 2.0 Turbo (205 PS) petrol engine.

The TS model used a five-speed manual gearbox, whilst the 2.5 and 3.0 had the option of a Sportronic automatic gearbox. The 3.0 V6, L5 2.4, and V6 Turbo were otherwise supplied with a six-speed manual gearbox.

The top models were named "Super", and included MOMO leather interior, 17" alloy wheels, rain sensitive wipers, cruise control, climate control and ICS (Integrated Control System) with colour screen. Options included xenon headlamps, GSM connectivity and satellite navigation.

The suspension system consisted of wishbones at the front and a multi-link setup at the rear.

Facelift (2003) 

By the second half of 2001, Centro Stile Alfa Romeo prepared a facelift for the Alfa 166. Designed by a newly hired Daniele Gaglione under the supervision of Wofgang Egger. In September 2003, the 166 was substantially revised, being unveiled at the Frankfurt Motor Show. As well as upgrades to the chassis, interior, and engine range, the styling was substantially altered. The new front end resembled the also recently revised 156.

Both the new 3.2-litre and the 2.0 Twin Spark models now featured the six-speed manual gearbox, whilst the 3.0 model was retained but made available only in the Sportronic form.

The L5 2.4 was re-engineered with Multi-Jet technology which allows up to five injections per cycle, second stage common rail, with a maximum injection pressure of 1400 bar and four valves per cylinder, to output a class-leading .

End of production 

In October 2005, the Alfa Romeo 166 was officially withdrawn from sale in markets for RHD. Sales of the 166 never grew as Alfa Romeo had hoped, following the facelift in September 2003, and the additional lack of a diesel engine in the United Kingdom, Australian, and Irish markets limited its reach into company car sectors. The 2.4 JTD diesel engine was only available in left-hand drive markets.

In June 2007, the production of the 166 effectively ended, with no direct successor. In September 2008, the platform was sold to the Chinese state-run manufacturer GAC Group. In total, fewer than 100,000 units were made.

In August 2009, Autocar named the 166 as "Britain's Worst Depreciating Used Car", as it held just 14.4% of its original used value after three years.

Engines

References

External links

166
Executive cars
Mid-size cars
Front-wheel-drive vehicles
2000s cars
Cars introduced in 1998
Sedans